The Nakajima Hikari (Japanese: 光 "Light") was a nine-cylinder, air-cooled, radial aircraft engine developed in Japan for Navy use during World War II by the Nakajima Aircraft Company. It was a development of the Nakajima Kotobuki and Wright Cyclone. In Army use it was known as the Ha20.

Variants
Hikari 1
Hikari 1 kai
Hikari 2
Hikari 3

Applications
 Aichi D1A2 
 Aichi D3A (first prototype)
 Kawasaki Ki-45 (first prototype)
 Mitsubishi F1M1
 Nakajima A4N
 Nakajima B5N1
 Nakajima C3N
 Yokosuka B4Y (B4Y1 fourth plane onward)

Specifications

See also

References

External links
 Classic Aeroplane Museum Nihon Koukuuki Jiten

Aircraft air-cooled radial piston engines
1930s aircraft piston engines
Nakajima aircraft engines